is the 51st single by the J-pop group Morning Musume, released in Japan on October 10, 2012.

History
The title song was premiered on YouTube, when on August 31, 2012, a dance rehearsal performance of it was uploaded to the Morning Musume official channel. The shooting of the music video itself was delayed due to Ayumi Ishida's and Haruka Kudo's injuries.

About a week later, another video of the dance was uploaded. This time, it was performed by the dance teachers of Morning Musume. As Morning Musume producer Tsunku explained, he wanted to show what his true intentions for the dance were and the teachers' performance captured the true atmosphere and allowed viewers to understand the concept.

Release details
The single will be released in seven versions: a regular edition and six limited editions: A, B, C, D, E, and F.。

The Limited Editions A, C, and E will come with a bonus DVD containing a special version of the music video for the song "One Two Three", while the Regular Edition and the Limited Editions B, D, and F will be CD-only.

Also, all the limited editions will include an entry card for the lottery to win a launch event ticket.

Members
 6th generation: Sayumi Michishige, Reina Tanaka
 9th generation: Mizuki Fukumura, Erina Ikuta, Riho Sayashi, Kanon Suzuki
 10th generation: Haruna Iikubo, Ayumi Ishida, Masaki Sato, Haruka Kudo

Wakuteka Take a chance Vocalists

Main Voc: Reina Tanaka, Riho Sayashi

Center Voc: Sayumi Michishige, Mizuki Fukumura, 

Minor Voc: Erina Ikuta, Kanon Suzuki, Haruna Iikubo, Ayumi Ishida, Masaki Sato, Haruka Kudo

Love Innovation Vocalists

Main Voc: Reina Tanaka

Center Voc: Sayumi Michishige, Erina Ikuta, Riho Sayashi, Haruna Iikubo, Ayumi Ishida, Masaki Sato

Minor Voc: Mizuki Fukumura, Kanon Suzuki, Haruka Kudo

Track listing

Regular Edition

Limited Editions A, B

Limited Editions C, D

Limited Editions E, F

Bonus
Sealed into all the Limited Editions
 Event ticket lottery card with a serial number

Charts

Sales and certifications

References

External links
 Morning Musume "Wakuteka Take a Chance" release site - Up-Front Works
 Profile on the Hello! Project official website  - Hello! Project
 Profile on the Up-Front Works official website 

2012 singles
Japanese-language songs
Morning Musume songs
Songs written by Tsunku
Song recordings produced by Tsunku
Zetima Records singles
2012 songs
Japanese synth-pop songs
Dance-pop songs
Electronic dance music songs
Torch songs